The position of Professor of Egyptology at the University of Oxford was established in 1924.  The post is associated with a fellowship at The Queen's College, Oxford.

List of Professors of Egyptology
The holders of the post have been:

Francis Llewellyn Griffith, 1924–1932
Battiscombe Gunn 1934–1950
Jaroslav Černý 1951–1965
John Barns 1965–1974
John Baines 1976-2013
Richard B. Parkinson 2013–present

References

Egyptology
Egyptology, *, Oxford
1924 establishments in England
The Queen's College, Oxford
Lists of people associated with the University of Oxford